PB-3 Kila Saifullah is a constituency of the Provincial Assembly of Balochistan.

General elections 2018
General elections were held on 25 July 2018

See also

 PB-2 Zhob
 PB-4 Musakhel-cum-Barkhan

References

http://www.electionpakistani.com/ge2013/pb/result.html
https://web.archive.org/web/20141121121143/http://elections.com.pk/results.php
http://ecp.gov.pk/ERConsolidated2013/AllResultsFull2013.aspx?assemblyid=PB

Constituencies of Balochistan